Austria competed at the 2022 European Championships in Munich from 11 August to 22 August 2022.

Medallists

Competitors
The following is the list of number of competitors in the Championships:

Athletics

Beach volleyball

Austria has qualified 4 male and 2 female pairs.

Canoeing

Men

Women

Cycling

Road

Men

Women

Track

Elimination race

Madison

Omnium

Points race

Scratch

Mountain bike

Gymnastics

Austria has entered 5 men and 5 women.

Men

Qualification

Individual finals

Women

Qualification

Rowing

Source:

Men

Women

Sport climbing

Source:
Boulder

Combined

Lead

Speed

Table tennis

Austria entered 5 men and 3 women.

Men

Women

Mixed

Triathlon

Mixed

References

2022
Nations at the 2022 European Championships
European Championships